Rubem Berta is a neighbourhood (bairro) in the city of Porto Alegre, the state capital of Rio Grande do Sul, in Brazil. It was created by Law 3159 from July 9, 1968.

The neighbourhood was named after , considered the first Varig employee and one of its former presidents.

A lower class area, Rubem Berta is next to the municipality of Alvorada.

Neighbourhoods in Porto Alegre